Leslie William Mitchell Hughson (12 September 1907 – 22 October 1985) was an Australian rules footballer who played for Collingwood, Hawthorn, Carlton, St Kilda and Fitzroy in the Victorian Football League (VFL).

Hughson is one of only four VFL/AFL footballers to have appeared for five separate clubs. His first port of call was Collingwood but he only played one game for the Magpies before switching allegiances to Hawthorn in 1928.

After his season at Hawthorn, the ruckman left the league for the Victorian Football Association and spent the next four years at Preston. He then had a stint at Carlton in 1934 before crossing to St Kilda mid season. It was at St Kilda that he played his only full season and he kicked 27 goals for them in 1935.

His fifth and final club was Fitzroy, a club that his brothers Fred and Mick also played for during their careers.

References

Holmesby, Russell and Main, Jim (2007). The Encyclopedia of AFL Footballers. 7th ed. Melbourne: Bas Publishing.
Les Hughson profile from Blueseum

1907 births
Australian rules footballers from Melbourne
Collingwood Football Club players
Hawthorn Football Club players
Carlton Football Club players
St Kilda Football Club players
Fitzroy Football Club players
Preston Football Club (VFA) players
1985 deaths
People from Richmond, Victoria